Noel Israel Khokhar is a retired Major General of the Pakistani Army. He was one of the highest-ranking Christian serving officers in the Pakistan Army. As of 2020, he is currently serving as an Ambassador of Pakistan to Ukraine

Early life
He was born in Lahore and attended the St. Anthony's High School in Lahore and Forman Christian College. Khokhar joined the Pakistan Army and passed out from the 62nd PMA Living Course in 1976 and was commissioned in the 9th Medium Regiment of the Pakistan Army Artillery on 24 October 1980.

Military career
He served in a variety of command and staff positions as well as with the United Nations. He has also been an instructor in Pakistan Military Academy, Pakistan Command and Staff College, and the National Defence University. He is also a graduate from the Institute of Advanced Studies in National Defence and Royal College of Defence Studies in the United Kingdom. He also holds a master's degree from Quaid-i-Azam University and King's College London and a PhD in International Relations.

On 9 May 2009, the Army Promotion Board in Rawalpindi promoted Brigadier Khokhar to the rank of major general.

According to an Inter Services Public Relations Press Release dated 6 September 2010 Khokhar was General Officer Commanding in 2010.

In 2011 Major General Khokhar commanded the 23rd Division. Khokhar had also been Chief Instructor of the A-Division at the National Defence University, Islamabad. In 2011 the President of Pakistan, Asif Ali Zardari awarded Khokhar the Hilal-i-Imtiaz (M). He had also been serving as DG ISSRA, a think tank at the NDU.

In 2011 he was also on the editorial board of the National Defence University Journal, Islamabad. He is one of the only Christian officers who have made it to the rank of major general.

He retired in August 2016 after serving for 36 years.

Later life
He is currently serving as the Ambassador of Pakistan to Ukraine.

Effective dates of promotion

Awards and decorations

References

Forman Christian College alumni
Recipients of Hilal-i-Imtiaz
Living people
Pakistani generals
Pakistani Christians
National Defence University, Pakistan alumni
Military personnel from Lahore
Punjabi people
St. Anthony's High School, Lahore alumni
Pakistan Army officers
Ambassadors of Pakistan to Ukraine
Pakistan Army personnel
People from Lahore
Pakistan Military Academy alumni
1960 births
Pakistani diplomats
Quaid-i-Azam University alumni
Alumni of King's College London
Graduates of the Royal College of Defence Studies